Ferry Branch is a stream in the U.S. state of West Virginia.

Ferry Branch was named so named on account of a ferry which operated near its mouth.

See also
List of rivers of West Virginia

References

Rivers of Kanawha County, West Virginia
Rivers of West Virginia